Blankenhof is a municipality in the Mecklenburgische Seenplatte district, in Mecklenburg-Vorpommern, Germany. The districts of Chemnitz and Gevezin belong to Blankenhof.

References

Grand Duchy of Mecklenburg-Strelitz